The Touch of Teddy Wilson is an album by American jazz pianist Teddy Wilson featuring performances recorded in 1957 for the Verve label.

Reception
Allmusic awarded the album 3 stars.

Track listing
 "Avalon" (Buddy DeSylva, Al Jolson, Vincent Rose) - 2:34
 "The Little Things That Mean So Much" (Teddy Wilson, Harold Adamson) - 3:02 	
 "'S Wonderful" (George Gershwin, Ira Gershwin) - 3:56
 "Someone to Watch over Me" (George Gershwin, Ira Gershwin) - 3:58
 "Jeepers Creepers" (Harry Warren, Johnny Mercer) - 4:07 	
 "If You Are But a Dream" (Moe Jaffe, Jack Fulton, Nat Bonx) - 2:45
 "Bye Bye Blues" (Fred Hamm, Dave Bennett, Bert Lown, Chauncey Gray) - 2:47
 "Sunny Morning" (Teddy Wilson) - 2:50
 "Talking to the Moon" (Billy Baskette, George A. Little) - 2:44
 "Dream House" (Lynne Cowan) - 2:43
 "Sometimes I'm Happy" (Vincent Youmans, Irving Caesar) - 4:30 	
 "That Old Feeling" (Sammy Fain, Lew Brown) - 2:46

Personnel
Teddy Wilson - piano 
Arvell Shaw – bass
Roy Burns - drums

References

Verve Records albums
Teddy Wilson albums
1957 albums
Albums produced by Norman Granz